The composer Wolfgang Amadeus Mozart (1756–1791) led a life that was dramatic in many respects, including his career as a child prodigy, his struggles to achieve personal independence and establish a career, his brushes with financial disaster, and his death in the course of attempting to complete his Requiem. Authors of fictional works have found his life a compelling source of raw material. Such works have included novels, plays, operas, and films.

Fiction
 The first major works of literature inspired by Mozart were by the German writers E. T. A. Hoffmann and Eduard Mörike. Hoffmann published his Don Juan in 1812, Mörike his Mozart's Journey to Prague in 1856.
 Mozart appears in Hermann Hesse's novels Der Steppenwolf  and Die Morgenlandfahrt.
 In 1968, David Weiss published Sacred and profane: a novel of the life and times of Mozart, a narrative account on the composer's life drawing heavily on the documented historical record, but with invented conversations and other details.
 In modern fiction, the mystery surrounding the composer's death is explored within a popular thriller context in the 2008 novel The Mozart Conspiracy by British writer Scott Mariani, who departs from the established Salieri-poisoning theory to suggest a deeper political motive behind his death.
 Mozart has also featured as a sleuth in detective fiction, in Dead, Mister Mozart and Too many notes, Mr. Mozart, both by Bernard Bastable (who also writes as Robert Barnard). Bastable's stories involve the conceit of an alternate history scenario in which the young Mozart remained on in London at the time of his childhood visit to England, where he has lived a long – though not very prosperous – life as a hack musician, rather than returning to his native Salzburg or Vienna to die young and celebrated. The stories are set in the 1820s and have Mozart interacting with King George IV and his immediate family including the young Victoria.
 Charles Neider's Mozart and the Archbooby is an epistolary novel in which the young Mozart writes to his father about his new life in Vienna and his new problem, the Archbishop of Salzburg. Stephanie Cowell's Marrying Mozart: A Novel provides a fictionalised account of Mozart's relationship with Aloysia Weber before his marriage to her sister, Constanze.
 Mirrorshades: The Cyberpunk Anthology (1986) is a defining cyberpunk short story collection, edited by Bruce Sterling. It contains a story, the "Mozart in Mirrorshades" by Bruce Sterling and Lewis Shiner, in which Mozart appears as a DJ wannabe instead of being the real Mozart after he met the people and culture of his future.
In The Amadeus Net, by Mark A. Rayner, Mozart is an immortal living in the world's first sentient city, Ipolis, where he supports himself by selling "lost" compositions and playing jazz piano in bars.
 The alternate history novel Time for Patriots has a trio of time travelers cure Mozart's wife of an abscess on her ankle (historically documented), which allows them to treat him when he falls ill. In consequence he does an opera based on Benjamin Franklin and composes other works until his death in 1805.

Drama
 Alexander Pushkin's play Mozart and Salieri is based on the supposed rivalry between Mozart and Antonio Salieri, particularly the idea that it was poison received from the latter that caused Mozart's death. This idea is not supported by modern scholarship.
 Peter Shaffer's play Amadeus focuses on the difference between true and sublime genius (Mozart) and mere high-quality craftsmanship (Salieri). Shaffer seems to have been especially taken by the contrast between Mozart's enjoyment of vulgarity (for which historical evidence exists, in the form of his letters to his cousin) and the sublime character of his music.
 In 2007, he was portrayed by John Sessions in the Doctor Who audio adventure 100 in a story that explored the ramifications of Mozart being granted immortality.

Film
 Stephen Haggard portrays Mozart in the 1936 British film Whom the Gods Love.
 Gino Cervi portrays Mozart in the 1940 Italian film Eternal Melodies.
 Hans Holt portrays Mozart in the 1942 Austrian film Wen die Götter lieben.
 Oskar Werner portrays Mozart in 1958 Austrian film Mozart.
 Cristopher Davidson portrays 14-year-old Mozart in Bologna in the 1984 Italian film Noi tre.
 Shaffer's play was subsequently made into a 1984 American film, Amadeus. Mozart was portrayed by actor Tom Hulce, who was nominated for the Academy Award for Best Actor.
 portrays Mozart in the 1991 Austrian film Wolfgang A. Mozart
 In the 2010 French film Mozart's Sister, a biopic of his older sister Nannerl, a young Mozart is played by French child actor David Moreau.
 Aneurin Barnard portrays Mozart in the 2017 film Interlude in Prague.
 Daniel Dorr portrays Mozart in the 2020 film Bill & Ted Face the Music.
 Mentioned during the "I've got a dream" song in the 2010 film Tangled.

Mozart's music has been used extensively in films since the silent era. In 1930, Buñuel used his Ave Verum Corpus in L'Age d'Or, Papageno's "Ein Mädchen oder Weibchen" from The Magic Flute features in The Blue Angel (1930), the "Rondo alla Turca" in the 1939 film Wuthering Heights, "Là ci darem la mano" in The Picture of Dorian Gray (1945), "Il mio tesoro" in Kind Hearts and Coronets, the Symphony No. 34 in Vertigo (1958), Eine kleine Nachtmusik in The Ipcress File (1965) and in Picnic at Hanging Rock (1975), the Piano Concerto No. 21 in Elvira Madigan, and in The Spy Who Loved Me (1977), the march from Idomeneo in Barry Lyndon (1975), the Jupiter Symphony in Annie Hall (1977), and many others.

Opera
 Nikolai Rimsky-Korsakov's opera Mozart and Salieri, based on Pushkin's play, treats the Salieri poisoning legend.
 In Reynaldo Hahn's "comédie musicale" Mozart with words by Guitry, Mozart has amorous adventures in Paris in 1778.
 Michael Kunze's and Sylvester Levay's musical, Mozart!, premiered in 1999 to portray an older, more sensually inclined Mozart as he struggles with the spectre of his chaste and productive "porcelain" boyhood. The musical was composed in German but is currently performed in Hungarian.
 The 2009 French musical Mozart, l'opéra rock premiered 2009 in Paris.

Popular music
 "Rock Me Amadeus" is a 1985 song by Austrian musician Falco from his album Falco 3; it was inspired by the movie Amadeus.
 The song "Travel" by The Gathering (on their album How to Measure a Planet?) was written for and about Mozart.
 The Wombles' second album Remember You're a Womble features Minuetto Allegretto, based on the 3rd movement of the Jupiter Symphony.
Peter Schickele, in his P. D. Q. Bach persona, has paid 'tribute' to Mozart in several pieces, most notably "Ein Kleines Nachtsmusik" and "A Little Nightmare Music," the latter offering a rather humorous retelling of Mozart's conflicts with Salieri.
Evanescence wrote a song featuring many parts of Mozart's Lacrimosa. The song was named Lacrymosa and it was recorded for their 2006 album The Open Door.

Children's literature
 Children's author Daniel Pinkwater has Mozart appear as a character in several of his books, including The Muffin Fiend, in which Mozart helps solve a crime involving an extraterrestrial creature who steals muffins from Vienna's bakeries.
 Mozart (as well as his sister Nannerl) are a major component in the second "39 Clues" book, One False Note.

Comic strip
 Mozart, his wife, associates, etc., appear in a story arc in the comic strip Pibgorn.

Television
 1982 : , six-episode TV series by Marcel Bluwal, with Christoph Bantzer as adult W. A. Mozart and Michel Bouquet as Leopold Mozart.
The 13-part 1991 documentary series Mozart on Tour details Mozart's travels and how they influenced his music.
Mozart appears in the episode "Calliope Dreams" of the Disney TV series The Little Mermaid (1992–1994).
The Mozart Band is a 1995 animated television series produced by the BRB Internacional.
 In 2004, the 11th episode of The Simpsons' fifteenth season, "Margical History Tour", features Mozart and Salieri in a mini-story with Bart (Nancy Cartwright) as Mozart and Lisa as Antonio Salieri.
 Wunderkind Little Amadeus, a television show produced in Germany in 2006, focuses on Mozart's life as a child in Salzburg. It has aired in English in Australia (ABC) and North America (KQED Kids).
Mozart appears in the Genie in the House, episode "Rock Me Amadeus" (2006).
Mozart appears regularly in the TV series Mozart in the Jungle (2014–2018).
 Mozart is one of the main characters in the 2016 comedy anime ClassicaLoid.

Video games
 The early music game, Amadeus Revenge (1988, Commodore 64) has the player play as Mozart to defend the integrity of his Piano Concerto No. 25 from the corrupting influence of rival musicians.
 The 1988 NES game The Adventures of Captain Comic features Sonata in A major, (K. 331) in the coast stage.
 Mozart appears in Scribblenauts and its sequels as something the player is able to summon.
 Mozart appears in the mobile game Fate/Grand Order as a Caster-class servant and an ally in the medieval France chapter.
 In the videogame Luigi's Mansion 3, a Boss Ghost bears the name Amadeus Wolfgeist, a pianist ghost who is located in an auditorium of The Last Resort.

Footnotes

Citations

Works cited

Biographic

Mozart in fiction